Bor Dahegaon Dam, is an earthfill dam on local river near Vaijapur, Aurangabad district in state of Maharashtra in India.

Specifications

Purpose
 Irrigation

See also
 Dams in Maharashtra
 List of reservoirs and dams in India

References

Dams in Aurangabad district, Maharashtra
Dams completed in 1998
1998 establishments in Maharashtra